The WTA Sydney, was a professional women's tennis tournament held in Sydney, Australia. The event, the first tournament in Australia exclusively for women, was played under various sponsored names as part of the WTA Tour and took place in November or the first half of December from 1976 through 1979. It was played on outdoor grass courts at the White City Stadium.

Champions

Singles

Doubles

See also
  New South Wales Open

References

External links
WTA website

WTA Tour
Grass court tennis tournaments
Defunct tennis tournaments in Australia